Knoop is a Dutch and Low German surname. Meaning "knot" and "button", it may have a metonymic origin referring to button maker.  Notable people with the surname include:

Abe Knoop (born 1963), Dutch football goalkeeper and goalkeeping coach
Anneliese Knoop-Graf (1921–2009), German non-fiction writer
Bobby Knoop (born 1938), American baseball player
 (born 1936), German contemporary painter and sculptor
 (born 1934), Belgian politician and Government Minister
Franz Knoop (1875–1946), German biochemist
 Frederick Knoop (1878–1943), American metallurgist
Knoop hardness test, a microhardness test for very brittle materials developed by him
Gerhard Knoop (1920–2009), Norwegian actor, stage producer and theatre director
 (1861–1913), German novelist
 (born 1943), Dutch journalist
Johann Knoop (1846–1882), Russian collector of musical instruments ("Baron Knoop"), son of Ludwig
 (1706–1769), German-born Dutch gardener and pomologist
Johannes Knoops (born c.1970), American architect
Ludwig Knoop (1821–1894), German cotton merchant and businessman
 (1853–1931), German folklorist and collector of fairy tales
 (born 1953), American race car driver
Savannah Knoop (born c.1980), half-sister of the partner of American writer Laura Albert (JT LeRoy)
Willem Jan Knoop (1811–1894), Dutch lieutenant-general, military historian, and politician

See also
Knop (disambiguation)
Koop (disambiguation)
Noop (disambiguation)

References

Dutch-language surnames
Low German surnames
Occupational surnames